József Dudás (22 September 1912 – 19 January 1957), a Hungarian politician and resistance fighter, was born in Marosvásárhely (in Romanian: Târgu Mureş) in Austria-Hungary (today in Transylvania, Romania).As a very young man, he joined the illegal Communist Party in Transylvania.  In 1933 he was arrested and sentenced to nine years in prison. When Northern Transylvania was transferred to Hungary as part of the Second Vienna Award in 1940, he was released and he moved to Budapest. During World War II, he worked within the anti-fascist movement acting as a liaison between groups. When the war ended, Dudás was a member of an unofficial ceasefire delegation that visited Moscow, and he was a founding member of the Liberation Committee of the Hungarian National Uprising.In late 1945 he joined the Independent Smallholders' Party and was elected to the Budapest government. As the communists mounted their campaign to take over Hungary, Dudás was arrested and detained until he was handed over to Romanian state security in 1951. Released in 1954, he returned to Hungary.Working as an engineer when the Hungarian Revolution of 1956 broke out, he took to addressing crowds and on 29 October, established the Second District National Committee, with a 25-point program demanding, a coalition government, a multi-party system and neutrality. He also started a newspaper (Magyar Függetlenség—Hungarian Independence), which headlined, ‘We do not recognize the present government!’ At this same time the so-called "Dudás Group" consisting of about 400 armed men was formed. Dudás soon acquired a bad reputation among the revolutionary forces, as he started  negotiations with Colonel Malashenko, acting chief of staff of the Soviet Special Forces, with the aim of being recognized by the Soviets as the main seat of political and military power in Hungary, instead of Imre Nagy. The Dudás group also became known for the campaign of terror it unleashed against members of Hungary's AVH Secret Police, lynching or otherwise executing offenders on sight.  The activities of the group went to such an extreme that other revolutionaries began arresting AVH officers for their own protection.He continued publishing his newspaper criticizing the Nagy government until his own armed men dismissed him on 3 November, and he was arrested by government forces for acts attributed to him, or rumors of such acts (an attack on the Foreign Ministry; looting of the National Bank). On 4 November he was wounded and taken to a hospital.On 21 November he was tricked into entering the Parliament building and was arrested by the Soviets. He was charged with leadership of a conspiracy and on 14 January 1957 he was sentenced to death. He was executed on 19 January 1957.

References

1912 births
1957 deaths
People from Târgu Mureș
People from the Kingdom of Hungary
Romanian people of Hungarian descent
Independent Smallholders, Agrarian Workers and Civic Party politicians
Hungarian revolutionaries
People of the Hungarian Revolution of 1956
Hungarian people executed by the Soviet Union
Romanian people executed abroad